Anne Henderson may refer to:

 Anne Henderson (author) (born 1949), Australian writer and editor
 Anne Henderson (educator) American museum educator
 Anne Henderson (politician) Northern Irish politician

See also 
 Henderson (surname)